The Super Bock Arena (Pavilhão Rosa Mota) is a cultural and sports arena in Porto, Portugal.

History

The pavilion opened in 1954. It was previously known as Pavilhão dos Desportos. In 1991, it was renamed after Portuguese, European, World and Olympic marathon running champion Rosa Mota.

In 2014, after a public call for tenders, a consortium between Lucios and PEV Entertainment was responsible for the rehabilitation of the arena. The initial cost of the rehabilitation was 8 million euros.

In November 2018, Porto's Municipal Chamber announced that following a naming agreement with Super Bock, the company's name was to be added to the arena, in the course of the 20-year private concession of the space.

The rehabilitation process was concluded in 2019. The arena now has the capacity to undertake events up to 8,000 people and is branded Super Bock Arena.

Besides cultural and sports events, the arena can now also function as a congress centre.

See also
 List of indoor arenas in Portugal

References

External links

 

Rosa Mota
Sports venues in Porto
Basketball venues in Portugal
Handball venues in Portugal
Volleyball venues in Portugal
1954 establishments in Portugal
Sports venues completed in 1954